Julius Lehrmann (23 October 1885 – 28 October 1962) was a Danish sports shooter. He competed in the 50 m pistol event at the 1936 Summer Olympics.

References

External links
 

1885 births
1962 deaths
People from Assens Municipality
Danish male sport shooters
Olympic shooters of Denmark
Shooters at the 1936 Summer Olympics
Sportspeople from the Region of Southern Denmark